Truth is an album by guitarist Robben Ford, notable for a well-received cover of Paul Simon's 1971 song "One Man's Ceiling is Another Man's Floor." "Riley B. King" is a homage to B.B. King.

Truth was nominated for the 2008 Grammy Award for Best Contemporary Blues Album and in August 2007 it became the number one blues album on the Billboard chart.

Track listing
 "Lateral Climb" (Robben Ford)  	4:19  	
 "How Deep in the Blues (Do You Want To Go)" (Gary Nicholson, Robben Ford)	4:18 	
 "Nobody's Fault But Mine" (Otis Redding) 	3:12 	
 "Riley B. King" (Kevin Moore, Robben Ford)	6:16 	
 "You're Gonna Need a Friend" (Anne Kerry Ford, Robben Ford)	5:44 	
 "One Man's Ceiling is Another Man's Floor" (Paul Simon) 	4:37 	
 "Too Much" (Gabriel Ford)	4:13 	
 "Peace on My Mind" (Robben Ford) 	6:01 	
 "There'll Never Be Another You" (Robben Ford) 	5:15 	
 "River of Soul" (Danny Flowers, Robben Ford)	6:18 	
 "Moonchild Blues" (Robben Ford) 	5:41

Personnel
 Robben Ford – guitar
 Dan Fornero – trumpet
 Dave Woodford – tenor saxophone
 Russell Ferrante – piano
 Jeff Babko – keyboards
 Larry Goldings – keyboards
 Bernie Worrell – keyboards
 Will Lee – bass
 Chris Chaney – bass
 Jimmy Earl – bass
 Charley Drayton – drums
 Gary Novak – drums
 Toss Panos – drums
 Bernie Dresel – drums
 Susan Tedeschi – vocals
 Siedah Garrett – background vocals
 Ken Stacey – background vocals

References

Robben Ford albums
2007 albums
Concord Records albums